Macrocystis integrifolia was considered a distinct species of giant kelp in the genus Macrocystis , based on blade and holdfast morphology. As of 2009, phycologists have collapsed Macrocystis integrifolia and the various other giant kelps into the single species, Macrocystis pyrifera.

Description
Deep brown color on flattened rhizomes which are profusely dichotomously branched. Each is attached by branched root-like structures coming out of the sides of the rhizomes. They have furrowed surfaces and taper gradually, but then have an oval or rounded float where attached to the stipe. The blade-like branches have notched denticulate edges leading to the terminal blade at the tip of the stipe, which is separated by several smaller branches.

Life history
It is found on intertidal rocks or shallow subtidal rocks along the Pacific coast of North America from British Columbia to California.

Macrocystis integrifolia alternates heteromorphic phases from a macroscopic sporophyte to dioecious microscopic gametophytes. It has been studied as a plant fertilizer, increasing bean yields up to 24% and chemical studies indicate presence of phytohormone-like substances.

In 2009, a study concluded that Macrocystis pyrifera is monospecific. The study suggests that Macrocystis integrifolia is not a separate species from the giant kelp (Macrocystis pyrifera). The claimed taxonomic distinctions between the two species are based on morphological features that, due to phenotypic plasticity, can vary greatly, and thus should be regarded as a monospecific genus.

References

External links
  Macrocystis integrifolia Bory California Biota Home Page... Protoctista... Phaeophyta

Laminariaceae
Flora of the Pacific
Marine biota of North America
Flora of California
Flora of the West Coast of the United States
Species described in 1826
Flora without expected TNC conservation status